Florent Bohez (born 19 January 1941) is a Belgian footballer. He played in three matches for the Belgium national football team in 1967.

References

External links
 

1941 births
Living people
Belgian footballers
Belgium international footballers
Place of birth missing (living people)
Royal Antwerp F.C. players
Association football defenders